The BYD e5 is a compact all-electric car manufactured by BYD, based on the gasoline-powered BYD Surui sedan, an internal combustion engine (ICE) car that had been introduced in 2012.

Specifications
Retail sales began in China in September 2015. 1,426 units were delivered in the Chinese market in 2015, and 15,639 in 2016. 17,065 units were sold in China through December 2016.

A 300-km-range version called BYD e5 300, which shares many characteristics with the BYD Qin EV300, was launched in 2016.

See also
BYD e1
BYD e6
BYD F3DM
BYD F6DM

References

e5
Production electric cars
2010s cars
Compact cars
Sedans